Free Scotland may refer to:

A Constitution for a Free Scotland
Radio Free Scotland